Ghostboat is a 2006 British television film, based on a novel by George E. Simpson and Neal R. Burger. The film features David Jason as its star. It is a fantasy tale of His Majesty's Submarine Scorpion vanishing during the Second World War, leaving only one crew member (David Jason) surviving. 38 years later, in the Cold War year 1981, the Scorpion reappears; the crew have disappeared, but the vessel is otherwise unchanged and has not aged in the intervening years. A Royal Navy crew along with the sole survivor of the original voyage is given the mission of retracing the last days of the boat prior to its 1943 disappearance. A supernatural influence takes hold of most of the crew, and they start showing characteristics of the old crew. They find themselves fighting Second World War ghosts.

Plot 

HMS Scorpion, a British submarine that had gone missing in the Baltic Sea during the Second World War, surfaces in the path of a Soviet freighter in 1981. The vessel is returned to British custody. Naval Intelligence is interested in the case because it seems that, for the first time, a ship has returned from "the Devil's Triangle of the North". The submarine opens its own hatch to let the investigating team in, where they find the vessel in a state of perfect preservation, but find no sign of the crew.

Jack Hardy is the only surviving member of the original crew, having been found floating and rescued in 1943 by members of Nazi Germany's Kriegsmarine; but he has no memory of the last days of the 1943 mission. He and Alan Cassidy, one of the vessel's designers, join a Royal Navy crew on a mission to retrace Scorpion'''s last days before it went missing. Commander Travis, a naval intelligence officer, is in charge of the mission while Captain Byrnes captains the submarine. The mission will take the submarine into Soviet waters, and a surface ship, HMS Oakland, escorts the boat. Once in the Baltic, the current crew begins to take on the personalities and identities of the dead crew, and the boat takes a degree of control over itself. Contact with Oakland is soon lost.

A "Soviet submarine" is detected and through communication error the crew fires upon it and destroys it. Scorpion surfaces to search for survivors, but, impossibly, no debris is found. Hardy realises that the "Soviet submarine" was destroyed at the exact same place and time where the Scorpion sank a German U-boat in 1943, and speculates that "the past is breaking through". Cassidy, who had supervised the fitting of the Scorpion with practice torpedoes, finds that they have become live weapons. Captain Byrnes tries to abort the mission, but Cdr Travis convinces him to continue. Hardy learns that the real mission is to discover and exploit the power that preserved and delivered the Scorpion.

Soon, three aircraft are detected on radar whilst the Scorpion is surfaced. The aircraft are Second World War Luftwaffe fighters; Captain Byrnes says in stunned disbelief "This can't be real". Travis pulls out a gun and orders Byrnes below. The fighters then strafe the boat with gunfire. The captain is killed, and Travis takes command. Cassidy and Hardy find no bullet damage on the deck or tower from the strafing attack, and conclude that Travis may have shot the captain to preserve the mission.

Travis apparently becomes possessed by the former captain himself. The original submarine captain's intent had been to torpedo ships of the German fleet in the then German city of Königsberg, which is now the Soviet city of Kaliningrad. Modern Soviet officers detect the incoming hostile vessel, and begin preparations for a nuclear war. Hardy manages to get the crew off the boat before it can attack the Soviet fleet, but Travis and the submarine, essentially as one entity, continue the attack. Hardy rewires the torpedo control system, causing the torpedoes to explode in the torpedo tubes. The explosion kills Travis, and causes the vessel to sink. Hardy is shot in the process. Hardy dies on his bunk, clutching a picture of his wife as the water engulfs him.

Six months later, the Soviets find the sunken Scorpion; it looks like it has been decaying for forty years. Neither Hardy's nor Travis' bodies are found. The Soviets close their investigation of the incident. British intelligence intercepts the Soviet report, leading British military authorities to also close their files on the case. The British Admiral says "There was no Kaliningrad incident; it never happened. The Scorpion sank in 1943".

 Cast 
 David Jason as Jack Hardy
 Ian Puleston-Davies as Travis
 Tony Haygarth as Alan Cassidy
 Julian Wadham as Captain Nathan Byrnes
 James Laurenson as Admiral Nealy
 Robert Whitelock as Spender
 Crispin Bonham-Carter as Redding
 Jamie Martin as Tyler
 Roger Evans as Monroe
 Jonathan Cullen as Captain Basquine 
 Alan Stocks as Peterson 
 Lee Whitlock as Reeves 
 Mark Callum as Callum
 Max Bollinger as Soviet Naval Captain
 David Nellist as 1943 Crewman
 Robert Horwell as Mason

 Production 
The film was announced in August 2005. David Jason was enthralled by the book Ghostboat and adapting it was a long-held wish of his.

The drama aired as two separate 90-minute episodes. It was one of the most expensive dramas ever made by ITV.
 
The submarine used in filming is the non-diving replica, built in Malta as the 'modified' S-33 for the film U-571, also shot in Malta. The replica is still afloat, moored in Marsa in the inner part of the Grand Harbour.

 Film versus novel

The 1972 book Ghostboat was set in 1974, and revolved around the re-appearance of the Pacific Fleet class Submarine 284 USS Candlefish, thirty years after it disappeared in the Devil's Sea in the Pacific off the Kuriles, toward Japan. The Candlefish surfaces in the path of a Japanese freighter northwest of Pearl Harbor. The characters and their names remain basically the same (e.g. Alan Cassidy is Walter Cassidy, Travis is Frank Crook) and the mission to re-trace the last days of the Candlefish has no undercurrent of intrigue.

In the original story Candlefish fell through a Geo-magnetic Anomaly (GMA), one of ten, five in the Northern Hemisphere, five in the Southern; and surfaced in the middle of another. The plot is concerned not so much with how the submarine came back, but why it came back.

The final mission of the Candlefish was changed by her captain, to an unplanned entry to Tokyo Bay, in an attempt to sink anything Japanese, and thus acquire a higher figure for tonnage sunk. This falls rapidly apart as the Candlefish sinks, with one survivor – Jack Hardy – injured and washed overboard from the conning tower. As the story concludes, Candlefish risks being unleashed on an unsuspecting Japan in 1974.

 Reception 
The film received a score of 6.5/10 on Internet Movie Database.

 Award nominations Ghostboat was nominated for the 2006 RTS Television Award for Best Sound - Drama.

 DVD release Ghostboat'' was released on DVD on 15 January 2007, nine months after its first showing on ITV on 9 April 2006.

Notes and references

External links 
 
 

2006 television films
2006 drama films
2006 films
2000s mystery drama films
2000s mystery thriller films
2006 British television series debuts
2006 British television series endings
2000s British drama television series
2000s ghost films
World War II television drama series
ITV television dramas
2000s British television miniseries
Films about spirit possession
Films set in 1943
Films set in 1981
Films set in the Baltic Sea
Films set in the Soviet Union
Television shows based on British novels
Television series by ITV Studios
Television series by Yorkshire Television
English-language television shows
Television shows set in England
Television shows set in Italy
World War II submarine films
Cold War submarine films
Submarine films
Films based on British novels
Royal Navy in World War II films